is a Japanese auto racing driver.

Career

JGTC and Super GT
Aoki competed in the GT300 class of the Japanese GT Championship between 1998 and 2004, winning the class in 2001 in a Nissan Silvia. JGTC became Super GT in 2005 and Aoki has continued to compete in the GT300 class in a variety of cars.

World Touring Car Championship
Aoki joined WTCC team Wiechers-Sport for the final three rounds of the 2008 season, in Italy, Japan, and Macau. He will return to Wiechers for the season-ending 2009 FIA WTCC Race of Macau. He scored 4 points in race 1 and 10 points in race 2 to finish 13th in the Yokohama Independents' Trophy.

References

External links
Official Website 
Career statistics at Driver Database

Living people
1972 births
Japanese racing drivers
Super GT drivers
World Touring Car Championship drivers
Sportspeople from Shiga Prefecture
Asian Le Mans Series drivers
21st-century Japanese people